MTU may refer to:

Companies
 Motoren- und Turbinen-Union, a former German engine manufacturer, now split into two companies:
 MTU Aero Engines, a German aircraft engine manufacturer
 MTU Friedrichshafen, an international diesel engine manufacturer
 Manitou Group, French manufacturer of forklifts, cherry pickers etc. (Euronext symbol: MTU)
 Mitsubishi UFJ Financial Group, New York Stock Exchange symbol MTU

Universities and colleges
 Madinatul Uloom Al Islamiya, Islamic boarding college in England 
 Mahamaya Technical University, an Indian public university
 Mandalay Technological University, a Burmese public university
 Michigan Technological University, an American public university
 Mohajer Institute of Technology of Isfahan, an Iranian professional-vocational university
 Mountain Top University, a Nigerian private university 
 Munster Technological University, an Irish public university

Other
 Maximum transmission unit, the size of the largest packet that a network protocol can transmit
 Metric ton unit, in metals trading
 Mobile Testing Unit, for COVID-19 in England, by NHS Test and Trace
 Migrants' Trade Union in Korea, represents foreign workers in South Korea